Wansunt Pit is a  geological Site of Special Scientific Interest in Dartford Heath between Crayford in the London Borough of Bexley and Dartford in Kent. It is also a Geological Conservation Review site. It is important geologically because it exposes the Dartford Heath Gravel, and the relationship of this exposure to the Swanscombe sequence and the Thames Terraces is a controversial issue in Thames Pleistocene studies. The site is part of Braeburn Park, a nature reserve managed by the London Wildlife Trust.

Archaeology
The site is also important archaeologically. Excavations going back over a hundred years have revealed stone tools of Homo Heidelbergensis, dating from Marine Isotopic Stage 11, equivalent to the geological Hoxnian Stage, an interglacial period between 424,000 and 374,000 years ago. Other finds include sixteen Bronze Age axes and seventeen Iron Age gold armlets.

The site
The site is divided into two units. The first is crossed by Galloway Drive and the second, which is inaccessible, is north west of Denton Road. Both are in an unfavourable condition.

See also

 List of Sites of Special Scientific Interest in Greater London
 List of Sites of Special Scientific Interest in Kent

References

Further reading
Lynne Bevan, Robert Hosfield et al (2005) Refitting Palaeolithic Artefacts from Wansunt Pit, Lithics 24

Sites of Special Scientific Interest in London
Sites of Special Scientific Interest in Kent
Geology of London
Geology of Kent
Geological Conservation Review sites